This is a list of New Zealand television events and premieres which occurred, or are scheduled to occur, in 1990, the 30th year of continuous operation of television in New Zealand.

This is a list of New Zealand television-related events in 1990.

Events
1 January – Welcome 1990 Haere Mai was broadcast on TV One. It marked the beginning of 24 hours of special, all-New Zealand TV programming and began with New Zealand feature films and excerpts from past television programmes. A three-hour entertainment special to celebrate 1990 was broadcast live from Bastion Point on TV One at 7.30pm that night.
17 January – The final episode of Gloss was broadcast on Channel 2 at 7.30pm.
24 January – The 1990 Commonwealth Games opened and TV One had live coverage.
9 February – The final weekday edition of The Early Bird Show was broadcast on TV3. The Early Bird Show was transferred to Saturday and Sunday mornings from 17 February onwards.
10 February – The New Zealand version of Treasure Hunt, based on the format of the French game show La Chasse au Trésor, premiered on TV One and screened Saturdays at 6.30pm, with Raylene Ramsay as studio host and Nick Tansley as direct skyrunner.
12 February – TV3's weekday transmission commenced at midday and all morning programming was dropped. The Oprah Winfrey Show premiered on TV3, as did the US soaps The Bold and the Beautiful and Another World. Nightline, as the late night edition of 3 National News, debuted and screened at 10.30pm.
16 February – RTR New Releases premiered on Channel 2. Screening Fridays at 4.30pm, RTR New Releases was the newest addition to the RTR portfolio (which included RTR Countdown and RTR Megamix) and devoted to 'the hottest of the week's new music releases' in a non-stop, video clip-based format. It later moved to 4.20pm as part of Friday's 3.45 Live!.
16 February – A Current Affair was dropped by TV3 due to poor ratings and strong competition from Holmes on TV One.
19 February – Programmes for North and South Island viewers commenced on TV One and screened weeknights as lead-ins to One Network News at 6pm. North Island viewers received Te Karere at 5.20pm and a sitcom rerun (i.e. M*A*S*H, WKRP in Cincinnati and George & Mildred during much of 1990) at 5.30pm. South Island viewers received a Bugs Bunny cartoon at 5.20pm, followed by a delayed broadcast of Te Karere (at 5.35pm), then The Mainland Touch (Christchurch) or The South Tonight (Dunedin) at 5.45pm.
19 February – Australian soap Home and Away moved from two double episodes a week (Tuesdays and Wednesdays at 7.30-8.30pm) to five half hour episodes a week (Monday to Friday evenings) at 6pm. 3 National News moved from 6pm to 6.30pm, but the weekend edition remained at 6pm.
10 March – Sounz!, which began in November 1989, was added to the RTR portfolio and renamed RTR Sounz!. Hosted by Robert Rakete, RTR Sounz! was a blend of 'the hottest music video releases, instant phone-and-win prizes and live acts' and screened Saturdays at 10am on Channel 2 (straight after What Now).
12 March – 3.45 Live! returned to Channel 2 with two new hosts, Hine Elder and Phil Keoghan.
23 March – Australian science and technology programme Beyond 2000 premiered on Channel 2 and screened Fridays at 8.30pm.
25 March – 60 Minutes resumed on TV3 and screened Sundays at 7.30pm. The programme was dropped earlier this year and its resources was transferred to A Current Affair before being dropped altogether, leaving the network with no regular current affairs programme.
13 April - The popular French children's cartoon Bouli made its New Zealand television debut on Channel 2.
14 April – Top Town screened on Channel 2 at 7pm in one hour-long highlights package.
14 April – The Early Bird Show changed its name to EBS.
14 April – The weekend edition of 3 National News moved to 5.45pm and was reduced in duration to 15 minutes. Home and Away extended to seven nights a week at 6pm.
16 April – Thomas the Tank Engine began screening on TV3; it was shown weekdays at 3.20pm.
21 April – The 1990 Top Town Final screened on Channel 2 at 7pm and acted as the final episode of Top Town. The series was revived by TVNZ in 2009. 
29 April – Marae, a block of Māori and Pacific Island programming, premiered on Channel 2 and screened Sundays from 10am–12pm during 1990. Each edition of Marae began with the archival documentary series Waka Huia at 10.05am and the Pacific news magazine Tagata Pasifika at around 11.05am. Panui ("The Word"), a media commentary segment, followed at around 11.28am and the last 25 minutes, from 11.35am, would be devoted to other programmes from TVNZ's Māori department: Pounamu (a docudrama series on seven leaders of Māoridom), Whakairo (a seven-part series which examined both contemporary and traditional Māori art), When the Haka Became Boogie (a seven-part series on Māori entertainers, musicians and artists), Revival (another opportunity to see past Koha programmes) and highlights from the 1990 National Aotearoa Cultural Festival at Waitangi.
29 April – A controversial Frontline documentary called For the Public Good was broadcast on TV One at 6.30pm. It explored the relationship between business and the Labour Government. The screening of the documentary led to a complaint from the New Zealand Business Roundtable and Treasury and an order for TVNZ to broadcast a correction and apology and to refrain from broadcasting advertising programmes via TV One from 6pm until closedown on the evening of Sunday 3 February 1991.
2 May – TV3 was placed into receivership but continued to broadcast.
18 May – Sky Network Television, New Zealand's first pay television service, began broadcasting to Auckland with three channels (Sky Movies, Sky Sport and CNN) on scrambled UHF frequencies. By mid-year, Sky extended its UHF service to Hamilton and Tauranga.
20 May – A second series of Pioneer Woman, over three parts, was broadcast on TV One in a mid-evening slot on Sunday nights. The first series was shown in 1983.
26 May – The final episode of It's in the Bag, from Kaikohe, was broadcast on TV One at 7pm.
2 June – The New Adventures of Black Beauty debuted on TV3 with a 90-minute series premiere at 6.30pm. The 26-part series screened Saturdays at 7.30pm.
13 June – The sitcom version of The Billy T James Show premiered on TV3 and screened Wednesdays at 7.30pm.
17 June – Opus, a weekly programme devoted to classical music and the performing arts, was replaced by a new series called 10AM. Screening Sundays at 10am–12pm (as the title suggested) on TV One, the series covered the arts spectrum, with news, reviews, features and performances in a magazine-style format. It combined locally produced items with content from The South Bank Show and the Australian series Arts World.
18 June – Home and Away moved to five days a week at 5pm on TV3, with The Oprah Winfrey Show in the new timeslot of 5.30pm (as a lead-in to 3 National News). 
25 June – Joanna Paul replaced Philip Sherry as anchor of 3 National News at 6.30pm and presented both 3 National News and Nightline on weeknights.
9 July – The Westcott File, a current affairs segment presented by Genevieve Westcott, began screening as part of 3 National News at 6.30pm.
20 July – The final episode of the New Zealand version of A Question of Sport was broadcast on TV One at 8pm. A Question of Sport was revived by TVNZ in 1994.
22 July – A New Zealand produced episode of the aviation documentary series Reaching for the Skies entitled "An End to Isolation" was broadcast on TV3 at 6.30pm. It traced the development of aviation in New Zealand, with archive footage, interviews with some of the country's early aviators and a look at the impact flying had had on the Land of the Long White Cloud.
27 July – Breakfast News (half hourly news and weather bulletins between 7–8.30am) was last broadcast on Channel 2.
August – Suzy Cato joined TV3 as co-host of EBS, alongside Russell Rooster and Kiri Kea.
1 August – The Billy T James Show took a break and was replaced by Larger than Life, an Australian sketch comedy series featuring The Comedy Company'''s Mark Mitchell, which took a not-very-serious look at life and its problems. Larger than Life screened Wednesdays at 7.30pm on TV3 and ran for six weeks. The Billy T James Show returned on 12 September.
6 August – The midday edition of One Network News was reduced in duration from a 15 minute bulletin to just five minutes.
9 August – The James Gang Rides Again, a documentary about Billy T James and five of his fellow heart transplant patients from Auckland's Green Lane Hospital, was broadcast on TV3 at 8.30pm.
13 August – Perigo, a weekly current affairs interview programme with Lindsay Perigo, was first broadcast on TV One. It screened Mondays at around 9.30pm but moved to Wednesdays from 3 October, beginning with the Perigo Election Specials in the lead-up to the 1990 election.
14 August – 1990: The Issues, a combination of sketch comedy and political satire with David McPhail and Jon Gadsby, premiered on TV3 and screened Tuesdays at 7.30pm as a lead-in to the 1990 election.
18 August – Animal Antics, a quiz show in which New Zealand celebrities were tested on animal facts to raise funds for their favourite animal charity, premiered on Channel 2. It was hosted by Mark Leishman and screened Saturdays at 6.30pm.
25 August – Pepsi began sponsoring RTR Sounz! and RTR Countdown through a naming rights agreement; both programmes screened on Channel 2. RTR Megamix and RTR New Releases finished a week earlier (as part of 3.45 Live!).
25 August – New Zealand's Funniest Home Videos, presented by Ian Taylor, premiered on Channel 2 and screened Saturdays at 8.05pm.
31 August – Radio with Pictures was revived on Channel 2 as a music video show with no presenters and screened Fridays at around 11.30pm.
1 September – Telethon 1990 was broadcast on Channel 2. Hosted by Paul Holmes, Judy Bailey and John Hawkesby, Telethon originated from Auckland, Hamilton, Palmerston North, Wellington, Christchurch and Dunedin and ran for 24 hours (from 7.30pm Saturday 1 September until 7.30pm Sunday 2 September).
2 September – Mark Leishman shaved the moustache, and Telethon 1990 raised over $4 million for the Celebration of Age Trust.
10 September – British soap Gems premiered on TV3 and screened weekdays at midday in a double episode format, and Home and Away moved to double episodes at 4.30pm.
13 September – An official opening concert of Auckland's Aotea Centre, featuring Dame Kiri Te Kanawa and the New Zealand Symphony Orchestra, was broadcast on TV One.
15 September – Infocus, a magazine-style news show for teenagers, made its debut as part of TV3's EBS. Created by TV3 producer Ian Kingsford-Smith and funded by NZ On Air, Infocus featured then 16-year-olds Tony Bartlett (Howick College) and Stephanie Tauevihi (Northcote College) as presenters. News and magazine items were produced by students from 11 Auckland schools. There were also news clips from other centres. An extended edition of Infocus, on Sundays (9-9.25am), was later added.
1 October – ITN World News was first broadcast on Channel 2 and screened weekdays at 7am, with a same-day repeat at 8am. During the summer months, ITN World News screened at 8am. 
2 October – The final episode of Wildtrack, a wildlife series for children, was broadcast on Channel 2 as part of 3.45 Live!. Taylormade Productions, a Dunedin-based independent production house, took over the production of Wildtrack in 1991 with a new name (Wild T) and a new format.
9 October – Roger Hall's Neighbourhood Watch, a comedy series about life in New Zealand suburbs, premiered on TV One and screened Tuesdays at 7.30pm.
11 October – Hard Copy, an American tabloid television show, began screening on TV One in the North Island and screened at 5.30pm as a lead-in to One Network News. It was later replaced by the British sitcom George & Mildred, and Hard Copy screened weekdays at midday from 3 December.
12 October – A Sir Howard Morrison special at the Aotea Centre, featuring the Auckland Philharmonia Orchestra, was broadcast on TV One.
13 October – 48 Hours, a US documentary series that deals with social issues, premiered on TV One and screened Saturdays at 7.30pm.
21 October – The mid-evening/late night edition of One Network News, on weekends, was last broadcast on TV One.
25 October – The final episode of Ten Out of Ten, a live programme to help solve homework problems with host Rodney Bryant, was broadcast on Channel 2 as part of 3.45 Live!. 
27 October – Lindsay Perigo and Paul Holmes presented TVNZ's election night coverage via TV One, while TV3's own coverage was presented by Bill Ralston, Genevieve Westcott and Joanna Paul. The governing Labour Party, led by Mike Moore, was defeated, ending its two terms in office. The National Party, led by Jim Bolger, won a landslide victory and formed the new government.
28 October – Living Treasures, a 10-part series in which Ian Fraser interviewed world figures who visited New Zealand as part of the 1990 celebrations, began screening on TV One.
23 November – Te Karere Headlines and the midday edition of One Network News were last broadcast on TV One.
25 November – The final edition of Frontline, from Wellington's Avalon Television Studios, was broadcast on TV One at 6.30pm. Within the next year, Frontline moved production to TVNZ's Auckland studios.
26 November – Beyond 2000 moved from Channel 2 to TV One and screened Mondays at around 8.30pm.
2 December – On weekdays Fast Forward (a science and technology programme from TVNZ), A Dog's Show and Country Calendar were repeated on TV One, and That's Fairly Interesting was repeated on Channel 2.
10 December – Cartoon All-Stars to the Rescue was simulcast on both TV One and Channel 2 at 4.20pm. Then-Prime Minister Jim Bolger introduced the New Zealand screening. Within the next year, Cartoon All-Stars to the Rescue was repeated on Channel 2 at 5pm on 14 October 1991 and simulcast with TV3.
14 December – The final editions of The Mainland Touch (Christchurch) and The South Tonight (Dunedin) were broadcast on TV One at 5.45pm.
14 December – The final edition of 3.45 Live! was broadcast on Channel 2.
14 December – Star Trek: The Next Generation premiered on Channel 2 and screened Fridays at 7.30pm during the summer of 1990/91.
28 December – Play School and other children's programmes were last broadcast on TV One. The New Zealand version of Play School ceased production during 1990 but continued to screen on Channel 2 in reruns a few years later.

Debuts
Domestic
16 January – Arthur Lydiard (TV One) (1990)
23 January – The Kenyans: Running a Revolution (TV One) (1990)
12 February – Nightline (TV3) (1990–2013)
16 February – RTR New Releases (Channel 2) (1990)
18 February – Betty's Bunch (Channel 2) (1990)
27 February – Royal Tours: The Queen and Us (TV One) (1990)
10 March – RTR Sounz! (Channel 2) (1990)
20 March – I Want to Die at Home (TV One) (1990)
25 March – 60 Minutes (TV3) (1990–1992, 2002–2012)
10 April – Gina, the Spirit of the Bluebird (TV One) (1990)
15 April – Circus Oz (Channel 2) (1990)
24 April Māori Battalion March to Victory (TV One) (1990)
29 April – Marae (Channel 2) (1990)
8 May – Miles Turns 21 (TV One) (1990)
18 May – The Main Event (TV3) (1990)
20 May – All for One (Channel 2) (1990)
20 May – Pioneer Woman (TV One) (1983, 1990)
29 May – Billy T James: Alive and Gigging (TV3) (1990)
2 June – The New Adventures of Black Beauty (TV3) (also United Kingdom and Australia) (1990–1992)
17 June – The Billy T James Show (TV3) (1990)
17 June – 10AM (TV One) (1990)
15 July – African Journey (Channel 2) (1990)
22 July – Reaching for the Skies - "An End to Isolation" (TV3) (1990)
9 August – The James Gang Rides Again (TV3) (1990)
18 August – Animal Antics (Channel 2) (1990)
25 August – New Zealand's Funniest Home Videos (Channel 2) (1990–1995)
31 August – Radio with Pictures (Channel 2) (1976–1988, 1990–91)
15 September – Infocus (TV3) (1990–1994)
9 October – Neighbourhood Watch (TV One) (1990)
27 November – The Great Earthquake Survival Test (TV One) (1990)

International
2 January –  Body Business (Channel 2)
2 January –  Professor Lobster (Channel 2)
2 January –  Kim (TV One)
3 January –  The Franchise Affair (1988) (TV One)
4 January –  The Richest Cat in the World (TV3)
5 January –  Nightmare in Badham County (TV3)
7 January –  Birds for All Seasons (TV One)
7 January –  Rage of Angels: The Story Continues (TV3)
7 January –  Game, Set and Match (TV One)
7 January –  By the Sword Divided (TV One)
17 January –  Heartland (1989) (Channel 2)
17 January –  Forgive Our Foolish Ways (TV One)
17 January –  American Wilderness (TV One)
20 January –  The Good, the Bad, and Huckleberry Hound (Channel 2)
21 January – / The Snow Spider (Channel 2)
21 January –  Chocky's Challenge (TV3)
22 January –  Hands of a Stranger (Channel 2)
24 January –  Island Son (Channel 2)
24 January –  Lena: My 100 Children (TV One)
26 January –  Spider-Man (1977) (TV3)
27 January –  Top Cat and the Beverly Hills Cats (Channel 2)
29 January – / Saber Rider and the Star Sheriffs (TV3)
29 January – / Police Academy: The Animated Series (TV3)
1 February –  Cloud Waltzing (Channel 2)
1 February –  Driving Academy (TV3)
2 February –  The Ultimate Stuntman: A Tribute to Dar Robinson (TV3)
2 February –  America's All Star Tribute to Elizabeth Taylor (TV3)
3 February –  Major Dad (Channel 2)
3 February –  The Jim Henson Hour (Channel 2)
3 February –  Yogi's Great Escape (Channel 2)
4 February –  A Death in California (TV3)
5 February –  Blackadder Goes Forth (TV One)
5 February –  The Critical List (TV3)
5 February –  Blood Vows: The Story of a Mafia Wife (Channel 2)
7 February –  Anything but Love (TV One)
8 February –  Supercarrier (TV3)
8 February –  The Dark Angel (TV One)
9 February –  Trackdown: Finding the Good Bar Killer (TV3)
9 February –  Highwaymen (TV3)
10 February –  Finnegan Begin Again (TV One)
10 February –  Scooby-Doo! and the Reluctant Werewolf (Channel 2)
11 February – / Jack the Ripper (1988) (Channel 2)
12 February –  Dress Gray (TV3)
12 February –  Bangers and Mash (Channel 2)
12 February –  C.O.P.S. (Channel 2)
12 February –  The Oprah Winfrey Show (TV3)
12 February – // Ox Tales (Channel 2)
12 February –  Give Us a Clue (TV3)
12 February –  Trial by Jury (TV3)
12 February –  The Bold and the Beautiful (TV3)
12 February –  Defenders of the Earth (Channel 2)
12 February –  Another World (TV3)
13 February –  Wisdom of the Gnomes (Channel 2)
13 February –  The Face of Rage (Channel 2)
14 February –  Woof! (Channel 2)
14 February – // Wowser (Channel 2)
15 February –  Brotherhood of Justice (Channel 2)
15 February –  Heathcliff and Marmaduke (Channel 2)
16 February –  The Adventures of a Blue Knight (Channel 2)
16 February –  Knight & Daye (TV One)
17 February –  Starcrossed (TV3)
17 February –  Slimer! And the Real Ghostbusters (TV3)
18 February –  Comeback (TV One)
18 February –  Napoleon and Josephine: A Love Story (TV3)
18 February –  Popples (Channel 2)
18 February –  Greenclaws (Channel 2)
19 February –  Studio 5-B (TV One)
19 February –  The One Game (TV One)
20 February –  The Defiant Ones (Channel 2)
20 February –  Shipwrecked (TV3)
22 February –  Six Against the Rock (Channel 2)
26 February –  The Death of Richie (Channel 2)
26 February –  Sword of Gideon (TV3)
28 February –  Dirty Dancing (TV3)
1 March –  Combat Academy (TV3)
2 March –  Monkeys (TV One)
3 March –  Peaceable Kingdom (Channel 2)
4 March –  Love with a Twist (TV3)
4 March –  Easy Street (TV3)
6 March –  Sidekicks (TV3)
6 March –  Murderers Among Us: The Simon Wiesenthal Story (TV One)
9 March –  Calendar Girl Murders (TV3)
9 March –  Doctor Doctor (Channel 2)
9 March –  Hot Dog (Channel 2)
18 March –  The Go Show (TV3)
19 March –  Bangkok Hilton (Channel 2)
19 March –  The Power, The Passion (TV3)
19 March –  Shaka Zulu (TV3)
21 March –  Windfalls (Channel 2)
22 March –  The Wonder Years (TV3)
23 March –  Beyond 2000 (Channel 2)
23 March –  How to Pick Up Girls (TV3)
25 March –  Raspberry Ripple (TV One)
25 March –  Gophers! (Channel 2)
7 April –  Case Closed (TV3)
7 April –  Country Clips (TV3)
8 April –  Just the Ten of Us (Channel 2)
8 April –  The Lion, the Witch and the Wardrobe (1988) (Channel 2)
9 April –  Family Feud (TV3)
10 April –  A Cry for Love (TV One)
10 April –  Crime Story (TV3)
11 April –  Moving Target (TV3)
11 April –  The Dirty Dozen: Next Mission (Channel 2)
12 April –  My Body, My Child (TV One)
13 April –  Bouli (Channel 2)
13 April –  Easter Dream (TV One)
14 April –  Poison Ivy (TV3)
16 April –  The Making of 0–9 (Channel 2)
16 April –  Ultraman: The Adventure Begins (Channel 2)
16 April –  The Murder of Mary Phagan (TV One)
17 April –  Alexei Sayle's Stuff (Channel 2)
17 April – / Maya the Bee (Saban dub) (Channel 2)
20 April –  Blue Thunder (Channel 2)
20 April –  The King of Love (TV3)
21 April –  Ladykillers (TV3)
21 April –  Unsub (Channel 2)
21 April –  Ring Raiders (Channel 2)
22 April –  Centennial (TV3)
22 April –  The Hymnmakers (TV One)
23 April –  Generations (TV3)
23 April –  Sister Kate (TV3)
24 April –  Nobody's Child (TV One)
24 April –  Bodytalk (TV One)
25 April –  The Irish Rovers Silver Anniversary (TV One)
25 April –  C.A.T. Squad (TV3)
26 April –  The Earth Day Special (Channel 2)
26 April –  A Question of Love (TV One)
29 April –  Eisenhower and Lutz (TV3)
29 April –  Eyes on the Prize (TV One)
2 May –  Bridge to Silence (TV3)
2 May –  He-Man and the Masters of the Universe (TV3)
4 May –  Airwolf (TV3)
7 May –  Mike and Angelo (Channel 2)
8 May –  All the Rivers Run II (Channel 2)
9 May –  Flight 90: Disaster on the Potomac (TV3)
10 May –  Hot Pursuit (TV3)
10 May –  Mork and Mindy (1982) (Channel 2)
12 May –  Free Spirit (Channel 2)
13 May –  Gentry (TV One)
13 May –  Police Story: The Freeway Killings (TV3)
13 May –  The Amazing Spider-Man (TV3)
14 May –  Alvin and the Chipmunks (Murakami-Wolf-Swenson/DIC version) (Channel 2)
15 May – / The Smoggies (Channel 2)
15 May –  Disaster at Hillsborough (TV One)
18 May –  Worlds Apart (TV One)
26 May –  Galtar and the Golden Lance (Channel 2)
26 May –  Great Circuses of the World (Channel 2)
28 May – / Act of Betrayal (TV One)
29 May –  Adam: His Song Continues (TV One)
6 June – / The Heroes (Channel 2)
6 June –  Stillwatch (TV One)
9 June –  The Lion of Africa (TV3)
15 June –  Top Secret (TV3)
15 June –  Moschops (Channel 2)
15 June –  The River (Channel 2)
15 June –  Poddington Peas (Channel 2)
15 June –  The Fonz and the Happy Days Gang (Channel 2)
16 June –  Hardball (Channel 2)
17 June –  The Zany Adventures of Robin Hood (TV3)
17 June –  The Heat of the Day (TV One)
18 June –  SST: Death Flight (TV3)
18 June –  The Centurions (Channel 2)
19 June –  Tudawali (TV One)
20 June –  Born to Be Sold (TV3)
21 June –  Stone Pillow (TV One)
23 June –  Don't Miss Wax (TV3)
24 June –  To Each His Own (TV One)
24 June –  Gunsmoke: Return to Dodge (TV3)
25 June –  Bosom Buddies (TV One)
29 June –  American Geisha (TV3)
30 June –  Floyd on Britain and Ireland (TV One)
9 July –  Les Misérables (TV One)
9 July –  Tanamera – Lion of Singapore (Channel 2)
9 July –  Vanity Fair (1987) (TV One)
10 July –  Baby Girl Scott (TV One)
10 July –  Confessions of a Married Man (TV3)
10 July –  This is David Lander (Channel 2)
11 July –  Mayday at 40,000 Feet! (TV3)
11 July –  The Return of Ben Casey (TV One)
18 July –  Trollkins (Channel 2)
28 July –  The Karate Kid (Channel 2)
29 July –  Lorne Greene's New Wilderness (TV3)
29 July –  The People Next Door (TV3)
29 July –  My Favorite Fairy Tales (Channel 2)
29 July – / The Heroes (TV3)
29 July –  Whales Weep Not (TV One)
29 July –  Korea: The Unknown War (TV3)
30 July –  Peter Pan: The Animated Series (Channel 2)
30 July –  The Marshall Chronicles (TV3)
1 August –  Larger Than Life (TV3)
1 August –  A Very British Coup (TV3)
3 August –  Threesome (TV3)
4 August –  Chicago Story (TV3)
4 August –  Learning the Ropes (Channel 2)
4 August –  War and Peace in the Nuclear Age (TV One)
5 August –  Laverne & Shirley (1981) (Channel 2)
5 August –  One More Audience with Dame Edna Everage (TV One)
6 August –  Beverly Hills Buntz (Channel 2)
7 August –  Jonny Quest (1986) (Channel 2)
7 August –  The Paradise Club (TV One)
8 August –  A Royal Birthday Gala (TV One)
10 August –  Desperate (TV One)
11 August –  Drift the Mute Swan (TV One)
12 August –  Body of Evidence (TV3)
12 August –  The Bourne Identity (Channel 2)
14 August –  Seabert (Channel 2)
14 August –  The Queen Mother at 90 (Channel 2)
14 August – / Paddington Bear (Channel 2)
15 August –  Elvis and Me (TV3)
17 August –  Winter Flight (TV One)
18 August –  HRH the Prince of Wales: The Earth in Balance (TV One)
19 August –  Dr. Jekyll and Mr. Hyde (Channel 2)
20 August –  Bad Boyes (Channel 2)
20 August –  HeartBeat (TV3)
21 August –  Dennis the Menace (1987) (TV One)
22 August –  No Strings (Channel 2)
22 August –  Dangerous Affection (TV3)
22 August –  Nadia (TV One)
24 August –  The Man Who Fell to Earth (1987) (TV3)
25 August –  Doogie Howser, M.D. (Channel 2)
25 August – ///// Frankenstein's Aunt (Channel 2)
26 August –  Oranges Are Not the Only Fruit (TV One)
26 August –  The Bell-Run (TV One)
27 August –  Album (Channel 2)
27 August –  Homeroom (TV One)
31 August –  The King of Love (TV3)
2 September –  Way Upstream (TV One)
3 September –  My Brother Jonathan (TV One)
4 September – / The Wonderful Wizard of Oz (Channel 2)
5 September –  Promised a Miracle (TV3)
7 September –  The Ryan White Story (TV One)
8 September –  The Young Riders (Channel 2)
9 September –  The Country Boy (Channel 2)
10 September –  Gems (TV3)
13 September –  Easy Prey (TV3)
14 September –  Will Vinton's Claymation Classics (Channel 2)
15 September –  Laguna Heat (TV3)
15 September –  Lost Worlds, Vanished Lives (TV One)
16 September –  Vietnam: The Ten Thousand Day War (TV3)
17 September –  Col'n Carpenter (TV3)
18 September –  Mr. Bean (TV One)
19 September –  An Early Frost (TV3)
21 September –  The Ratties (Channel 2)
22 September –  War and Remembrance (TV One)
23 September –  Making News (TV One)
23 September –  And a Nightingale Sang (TV One)
24 September –  The Saint in Manhattan (TV One)
24 September –  The Great Bookie Robbery (TV One)
24 September –  Braker (TV One)
26 September –  Cracked Up (TV One)
26 September –  Foofur (Channel 2)
27 September –  Gumby Adventures (Channel 2)
27 September –  Two Men (TV One)
28 September –  A Stoning in Fulham County (TV One)
30 September –  Summer's Lease (TV One)
1 October –  The Labours of Erica (TV One)
2 October –  May to December (TV One)
3 October –  Mama's Going to Buy You a Mockingbird (TV One)
5 October –  No Job for a Lady (TV One)
5 October –  Vengeance: The Story of Tony Cimo (TV3)
5 October –  Flying Squad (TV One)
6 October –  Just for Laughs (TV3)
7 October –  Last Night of the Proms (TV One)
7 October –  Chocky's Children (TV3)
8 October – / Star Wars: Droids (Channel 2)
8 October –  Firefighter (TV One)
9 October –  Shadow of the Cobra (Channel 2)
9 October –  FM (TV One)
9 October –  One of the Boys (1989) (TV One)
9 October –  The California Raisin Show (Channel 2)
10 October –  Destination America (TV One)
10 October – / Liberace: Behind the Music (TV3)
11 October –  Hard Copy (TV One)
11 October –  Fight for Life (TV One)
13 October –  Wolf (TV3)
13 October –  48 Hours (TV One)
14 October –  Jumping the Queue (TV One)
14 October –  The Greatest Adventure: Stories from the Bible (Channel 2)
17 October –  Live-In (TV One)
17 October –  The Hallo Spencer Show (Channel 2)
17 October –  What Price Victory (TV One)
18 October –  Divorce Wars: A Love Story (TV One)
18 October –  The Poison That Waits (TV One)
18 October –  Dream Date (TV3)
19 October –  Satellite City (Channel 2)
25 October – / Star Wars: Ewoks (Channel 2)
27 October –  Dink, the Little Dinosaur (Channel 2)
28 October –  First of the Summer Wine (TV One)
28 October –  C.A.T. Squad: Python Wolf (TV3)
4 November –  She's Been Away (TV One)
4 November –  20,000 Leagues Under the Sea (Channel 2)
7 November –  Infidelity (TV3)
8 November –  A Bit of Fry and Laurie (TV One)
17 November –  The Flying Gourmet's Guide: A Guide to the Great British Bird Table ( TV One)
19 November –  Lonesome Dove (Channel 2)
20 November –  Harem (TV3)
21 November –  On the Up (TV One)
29 November –  Totally Hidden Video (Channel 2)
29 November –  Capital City (Channel 2)
2 December –  Happy Birthday Bugs: 50 Looney Years (Channel 2)
2 December –  Into the Homeland (TV3)
2 December –  Gruey Twoey (Channel 2)
2 December –  You Can't Do That on Television (TV3)
2 December –  Mad Scientist (Channel 2)
3 December –  America's Funniest People (Channel 2)
3 December – // Heathcliff (Channel 2)
4 December –  Running Wild (TV3)
5 December –  Captain Planet and the Planeteers (Channel 2)
5 December –  The Gary Coleman Show (Channel 2)
8 December –  The Kit Curran Radio Show (TV3)
8 December –  Prime Time Pets (Channel 2)
9 December –  Dragnet Today (Channel 2)
9 December –  You Rang M'Lord? (TV One)
9 December –  Fight Cancer (TV One)
9 December –  The Beiderbecke Connection (TV One)
9 December –  Marvin, Baby of the Year (Channel 2)
9 December –  Anne of Green Gables (Channel 2)
9 December –  Beauty Queens (TV One)
10 December –  Cartoon All-Stars to the Rescue (TV One)/(Channel 2)
10 December –  Blackadder's Christmas Carol (Channel 2)
10 December –  Snoops (TV3)
11 December –  The Forest of Boland Light Railway (TV One)
12 December –  Baywatch (Channel 2)
14 December –  Star Trek: The Next Generation (Channel 2)
25 December –  The Adventures of Candy Claus (TV3)
25 December –  Fireman Sam: Snow Business (Channel 2)
25 December –  Mother Goose Rock 'n' Rhyme (Channel 2)
27 December –  Adam-12 (1990) (Channel 2)
30 December –  Chance in a Million (TV One)
31 December –  Carreras Domingo Pavarotti in Concert (TV One)
31 December –  The Fruitties (Channel 2)
31 December – / The Adventures of the Galaxy Rangers (Channel 2)
31 December –  The New Adventures of Batman (Channel 2)
 Dungeons & Dragons (Channel 2)

Changes to network affiliation
This is a list of programs which made their premiere on a New Zealand television network that had previously premiered on another New Zealand television network. The networks involved in the switch of allegiances are predominantly both free-to-air networks or both subscription television networks. Programs that have their free-to-air/subscription television premiere, after previously premiering on the opposite platform (free-to air to subscription/subscription to free-to air) are not included. In some cases, programs may still air on the original television network. This occurs predominantly with programs shared between subscription television networks.

International

New channels

Subscription
Sky Sport
Sky Movies
CNN

Television shows
Play School (1975–1990)
What Now (1981–present)
Gloss (1987–1990)
Blind Date (1989–1991)
The Early Bird Show (1989–1992)
Shark in the Park (1989–1992)
New Zealand's Funniest Home Videos (1990–1995)
60 Minutes (1990–present)

Ending this year
3:45 Live (Channel 2) (1989–1990)
Gloss (Channel 2) (1987–1990)
It's in the Bag (TV One) (1974–1979, 1986–1990)
Opus (TV One) (1980s–1990)
LaughINZ (TV3) (1989–1990)
The Mainland Touch (TV One) (1980–1990)
Perfect Match (TV3) (1989–1990)
Play School (TV One/Channel 2) (1975–1990)
A Question of Sport (TV One) (1988–1990)
RTR Megamix (Channel 2) (1988–1990)
RTR New Releases (Channel 2) (1990)
The South Tonight (TV One) (1980–1990)
Ten Out of Ten (Channel 2) (1989–1990)
Top Town (Channel 2) (1976–1990)
The Video Dispatch (Channel 2) (1980–1990)
Wildtrack (Channel 2) (1981–1990)

References